Winya is a rural locality in the Somerset Region, Queensland, Australia.

Geography
Sandy Creeks marks a section of the eastern boundary and Kilcoy Creek aligns with some of the eastern border.  In the south the locality protrudes into the waters of Somerset Dam when it is at full capacity. Kilcoy Weir straddles the boundary with Mount Kilcoy in the north. 

The D'Aguilar Highway passes through Winya.

Kilcoy Airfield is in the south of locality on Kennedys Road.

History
Kilcoy Homestead was established in Winya in the 1850s.  Settlement in the area had begun as early as 1841.

Winya State School opened in 1918 and closed in 1960. The school was on a  site on the north-east corner of the D'Aguilar Highway and Sandy Creek Road, now in neighbouring Sandy Creek.

The Kilcoy railway line from Caboolture reached Winya and through to Kilcoy on 22 December 1913, with the locality served by Winya railway station . The Wamuran to Kilcoy section (including Winya) was closed on 30 June 1964.

Economy
The Kilcoy Pastoral Company operates an abattoir in Winya.  The facility exports beef to more than 20 countries and employs more than 750 workers making it one the five largest beef processors in the country.

Education 
There are no schools in Winya. The nearest government primary school is Kilcoy State School in neighbouring Kilcoy to the west. The nearest government secondary school is Kilcoy State High School, also in Kilcoy.

Amenities 
The Kilcoy Airfield is available only for recreational use and not for commercial operations.

There are a number of parks in the area:

 Anzac Park
 Aston Park

 Somerset Dam

References

Further reading

External links 

Suburbs of Somerset Region
Localities in Queensland